Vansville is an unincorporated community in Prince George's County, Maryland, United States. For statistical purposes, it is part of the Beltsville census-designated place (CDP).

Vansville is named after the Van Horne family, who operated a tavern along the post road (U.S. Route 1).

References

Unincorporated communities in Prince George's County, Maryland
Unincorporated communities in Maryland